Akureyri Airport (regionally also )  is a single-runway international airport in Akureyri, Iceland,  south of the town centre. Icelandair and Norlandair link the airport with several domestic locations.

History
Scheduled air travel to Akureyri started in 1928 when Flugfélag Íslands ("Airline of Iceland") began flying on seaplanes to Reykjavík, landing on the fjord of Eyjafjörður near downtown Akureyri. The airline was short-lived, as it ceased operations after only three years. Another airline, Flugfélag Akureyrar ("Airline of Akureyri"), was founded in 1937 and in 1940 it changed its name to Flugfélag Íslands, though it was in no way affiliated with its predecessor.
In 1944, Loftleiðir started flying from Reykjavík on Grumman Goose seaplanes, which added competition to the popular route.

It was not until the early 1950s that construction of the airport itself started on top of a landfill on the delta of Eyjafjörður river, a few kilometres from the town's center. A new terminal was constructed in 1961. It was renovated in 2000 to better equip the airport for International flights.

In 1952, Loftleiðir decided to cease domestic flights and to concentrate on international flights to Europe and North America. This left Flugfélag Íslands alone on the route, operating Douglas DC-3 aircraft until 1973. In 1965, the airline introduced the Fokker F27 to its domestic fleet. It replaced this craft with the Fokker 50 in 1992, which have since been replaced by DeHavilland Canada Dash 8 planes.

In 1973, Loftleiðir and Flugfélag Íslands merged into Icelandair. One year later, a new airline was founded in Akureyri, Flugfélag Norðurlands, and operated numerous domestic flights and charter flights to Greenland.

In 1997, The domestic division of Icelandair merged with Flugfélag Norðurlands to form Flugfélag Íslands (the third airline with that name), or Icelandair as it is called in English.

In 2006, Mýflug, under a contract with the Icelandic government, began providing ambulance flight service to Iceland, with a specially equipped aircraft based at Akureyri airport. In 2008, the operation was moved to the newly built Hangar 13.

In 2008, Norlandair was founded, which serves destinations in north-eastern Iceland in cooperation with Icelandair and operates various charter flights to Greenland.

In the summer of 2009, Isavia completed an almost two-year runway renovation program. It included lengthening the runway by 500 metres to the south, improving runway lighting and enhancing the approach system. In 2010, a new instrument landing system approach navigational aid was installed.

In 2022, the first airline specifically serving international destinations in northern Iceland, Niceair, began operations at Akureyri airport. They initially began serving Copenhagen and Tenerife.

Isavia is currently expanding the passenger terminal and ramp area. This is to better suit the needs of larger aircraft and an increasing number of passengers, and also to establish a safe alternate airport for flights to Keflavík Airport, Iceland's largest airport. The need for a larger terminal and ramp was obvious during the 2010 eruptions of Eyjafjallajökull, when many international flights were operated from Akureyri after Keflavík airport was closed due to volcanic ash. Passenger numbers were far above the terminal's capacity and a limited amount of ramp space was available for large aircraft.

Construction on the passenger terminal extension and ramp area began in June 2021 and is projected to be ready for use in summer 2023. The expansion will add 1100m2 of terminal area, with separate facilities for international and domestic traffic. The ramp area is being extended into the river delta, requiring landfill. Much of the material needed for the landfill was obtained from scrap rubble from the construction of the nearby Vaðlaheiðargöng tunnel.

Airlines and destinations
The following airlines operate regular scheduled and charter flights at Akureyri Airport:

Statistics

See also
Transport in Iceland
List of airports in Iceland

References

External links

OurAirports – Akureyri

Airports in Iceland
Airports established in 1928
Akureyri
1928 establishments in Iceland
International airports in Iceland